

Maximilian von Edelsheim (6 July 1897 – 26 April 1994) was a general in the Wehrmacht of Nazi Germany during World War II. He was a recipient of the  Knight's Cross of the Iron Cross with Oak Leaves and Swords.

He negotiated the surrender of German forces to the Americans at the bridge at Tangermünde on the Elbe River on or about May 2, 1945. The German 12th Army, under General Walther Wenck had previously done a 180 degree turn away from the Western Allies, resulting from an order to relieve Berlin from the Soviet attack. Disobeying the order, Wenck fought due East, into the Spree Forest region, toward the town of Halbe and linked up with the remnants of the German 9th Army. They then reversed and went west, back to the Elbe. There, Edelsheim crossed the Elbe on a schwimmwagen and negotiated the surrender of all German forces on the West side of the Elbe to the Americans.

Awards
 Iron Cross (1914)  2nd Class (27 November 1915) & 1st Class (26 October 1918)
 Knight, 2nd Class of Order of the Zähringer Lion with Swords 2nd Class (19 September 1939) & 1st Class (14 October 1939)
  Knight's Cross of the Iron Cross with Oak Leaves and Swords
 Knight's Cross on 30 July 1941 as Oberstleutnant and commander of Radfahr-Abteilung 1
 Oak Leaves on 23 December 1942 as Oberst and commander of Panzergrenadier-Regiment 26
 Swords on 23 October 1944 as Generalleutnant and commander of 24. Panzer-Division

References

Citations

Bibliography

 
 
 

1897 births
1994 deaths
Military personnel from Berlin
People from the Province of Brandenburg
German Army personnel of World War I
Barons of Germany
Generals of Panzer Troops
Recipients of the Knight's Cross of the Iron Cross with Oak Leaves and Swords
Recipients of the clasp to the Iron Cross, 1st class
Prussian Army personnel
Reichswehr personnel
20th-century Freikorps personnel
German Army generals of World War II
German prisoners of war in World War II held by the United States